T. H. Denny House, also known as "Mount Pinder," is a historic home and farm located at Kenton, Kent County, Delaware.  The house dates to the last quarter of the 18th century, and is a two-story, five bay, center hall plan brick dwelling. It has a gable roof and the front facade features an entrance portico added in the mid-19th century.  It has a rear wing also added in the mid-19th century. Also on the property are a contributing barn, stable, and machine shed.

It was listed on the National Register of Historic Places in 1983.

References

Houses on the National Register of Historic Places in Delaware
Houses in Kent County, Delaware
Kenton, Delaware
National Register of Historic Places in Kent County, Delaware